The Filmfare Best South Editor Award is given by the Filmfare magazine as part of its annual Filmfare Awards for South Indian films.

The award was first given in 2005. Here is a list of the award winners and the films for which they won.

See also 
 Filmfare Awards South

References

Editor
Film editing awards